Anarsia triglypta is a moth in the family Gelechiidae. It was described by Edward Meyrick in 1933. It is found in north-eastern India.

The larvae feed on the leaves of Senegalia catechu.

References

Moths described in 1933
triglypta
Moths of Asia